Ellisonia is an extinct genus of conodonts in the family Ellisoniidae.

References 

 Bibliography of conodonts. by Samuel P Ellison (1977)

External links 

 
 Ellisonia at fossilworks.org (retrieved 22 April 2016)

Prioniodinida genera